Mohammad Rashed Sanad Al Fadhli (born 1 July 1987) is a Kuwaiti footballer who is a defender for the Kuwaiti Premier League club AL-Arabi SC.

References

1987 births
Living people
Kuwaiti footballers
Qadsia SC players
Footballers at the 2006 Asian Games
Sportspeople from Kuwait City
Al-Arabi SC (Kuwait) players
Association football defenders
Asian Games competitors for Kuwait
Kuwait international footballers
Al-Fahaheel FC players
Al-Nasr SC (Kuwait) players
Kuwait Premier League players